Blennosperma is a genus of plants in the sunflower family. They are known commonly as stickyseeds; the name Blennosperma is Greek for "slimy seed."

 Species
 Blennosperma bakeri - Baker's stickyseed - California
 Blennosperma chilense - Chilean stickyseed - Chile (Provinces of Maule, O'Higgins, Valparaíso)
 Blennosperma cretacea  - southern Venezuela, northwestern Brazil
 Blennosperma nanum - glueseed - California

References

External links
 USDA Plants Profile

Senecioneae
Asteraceae genera